Amy Seiwert  is an American contemporary ballet choreographer and artistic director. She is the founder and artistic director of Amy Seiwert’s Imagery, a contemporary ballet company in San Francisco.

Biography 
Born in Cincinnati, Ohio, Amy Seiwert had a nineteen year performance career dancing with Smuin Ballet, Los Angeles Chamber Ballet and Sacramento Ballet.

During Seiwert's time dancing with Smuin Ballet, she became involved with the “Protégé Program” where her choreography was mentored by the late Michael Smuin. Seiwert was Smuin Ballet's "Choreographer in Residence" from 2008-2018.

From 2013-2015, Seiwert was Artist-in-residence at ODC Theater and in 2017 she was named  the first National Artist-in-Residence with the Joyce Theater. Her work can be found in the repertories of Ballet Austin, BalletMet, Smuin Ballet, Washington Ballet, Atlanta Ballet, Oakland Ballet, Sacramento Ballet, Colorado Ballet, Louisville Ballet, Cincinnati Ballet, Carolina Ballet, Oklahoma City Ballet, Dayton Ballet, Milwaukee Ballet and American Repertory Ballet, as well as AXIS Dance and Robert Moses' KIN.

Seiwert has collaborated with visual designers Marc Morozumi and Matthew Antaky, composers Daniel Bernard Roumain, Christen Lien, and Kevin Keller, media designer Frieder Weiss and spoken-word artist Marc Bamuthi Joseph.

From July 2018 - July 2020, Seiwert was Artistic Director of Sacramento Ballet.

Choreographic style 
Amy Seiwert is known for her willingness to take creative risks to innovate classical ballet choreography. Seiwert incorporates contemporary themes, narratives, music, and collaborators. Rita Felciano of the San Francisco Bay Guardian has said Seiwert, "...quite possibly is the Bay Area’s most original dance thinker, taking what some consider a dead language and using it as a 21st-century lingo to tell us something about who we are.”

Awards and recognition 

 1999 Winner, Le Festival des Arts de Saint-Sauveur Choreography Competition
2000 Choreographer in Residence, Le Festival des Arts de Saint-Sauveur
2005 Dance Magazine: "25 to Watch"
2006, 2009 Invited to New York City Ballet's Choreographic Institute
 2007, 2010, 2015, 2016, San Francisco Chronicle: "Top 10 Dance Events"
 2010 San Francisco Bay Guardian: "Goldie"
2011 Nominee, Isadora Duncan Award for Outstanding Choreography for White Noise
2012 Nominee, Isadora Duncan Award for Outstanding Choreography for Requiem
2012 Nominee, Isadora Duncan Award for Outstanding Choreography for When It Frays
2014 Nominee, Isadora Duncan Award for Outstanding Choreography for Devil Ties My Tongue
2015 Second Place, McCallum Theater Choreography Festival
2015 Winner, Isadora Duncan Award for Outstanding Choreography for Back To
2020 Nominee, Isadora Duncan Award for Outstanding Choreography for Renaissance
2021 "Office Hours" Artist Residency at the Kennedy Center's The REACH

Support 
Amy Seiwert's work has been supported by the National Endowment for the Arts, San Francisco Grants for the Arts, Kenneth Rainin Foundation, California Arts Council, Fleishhacker Foundation, New Music USA, and the Zellerbach Family Foundation.

References

External links 
 Amy Seiwert's Imagery
 Amy Seiwert's Vimeo Channel

Year of birth missing (living people)
Living people
People from Cincinnati